Jamal Yassine (Arabic: جمال ياسين) is a Lebanese-Egyptian composer, music producer and singer. He is currently the  general manager of Arabica Music record label. Yassine has worked with several artists and musicians including, Elissa, Saber Rebaï, Wael Kfoury, Saad Lamjarred, Joseph Attieh, Muhammad EL Majzoub, Ibrahim El Hakami, Brigitte Yaghi and Maritta Hallani.

Career 
Yassine's interest in music began when he was 6, and started singing while he was at school for fun and decided later to sing professionally after receiving praise from his peers for his voice. During his career, he learned to play guitar and piano.

In 2010, Yassine collaborated with several musicians including Ayman Bahgat Kamar, Amir Teima, Nizar Francis,  Samir Sfeir, Walid Saad and Amr Mostafa, and released his debut album Betnassiny Hayati via the record label Arabica Music.

In January 2021, Yassine collaborated with Joseph Attieh and produced Tabii, which peaked at the top of the Khaliji music in Lebanon, Palestine, Iraq, the Gulf, Syria and Yemen on Anghami and YouTube in Lebanon for 3 months.
In May 2021, Yassine composed Wael Kfoury's Kelna Mnenjar, the theme song of the TV series Downtown which peaked at #1 on YouTube within a few days of releasing the song.
In April 2022, Yassine teamed up with Saad Lamjarred and produced nasheed style  song Al Tawba, the song peaked at #1 on YouTube.

Discography

Albums 

 2010: Betnassiny Hayati - singer

Singles 
As a composer / music producer

 2022: Wahdani, Joseph Attieh
 2022: Kan Bena Kteer, Brigitte Yaghi
 2022: Al Tawba, Saad Lamjarred
 2021: Tabii, Joseph Attieh
 2021: Kelna Mnenjar, Wael Kfoury
 2021: Mnehkom 3al Nas, Joseph Attieh
 2021: Kanoun El Hayat, Farah Nakhoul
 2021: Melh W Dab, Hussein El Salman
 2021: Khoun, Scenario
 2020: Wafy, Elissa
 2020: Mashi, Jad Shwery ft. Jamal Yassine & Rami Chalhoub
 2020: El Essa Kella, Kosai Khauli ft. Ismaeil Tamr
 2020: Oudi, Ismaeil Tamr
 2020: Khod El Nas, Abbas Jaafar
 2022: Haydi Halti, Mohamed El Majzoub
 2020: Ammo, Ammo Fahd
 2020: Rassi Baalbaki, Abbas Jaafar
 2020: Baleez, La, K, CatShi
 2020: Waat El Jad, Raphael Jabbour
 2019: Sdomni Bi Shi, Reem El Sharif
 2018: Akher Hami, Ibrahim El Hakami
 2018: Tahiyaty, Ibrahim El Hakami
 2018: Abel Ba2a, Ibrahim El Hakami
 2018: Sama3ouh, Ibrahim El Hakami
 2017: Shta2telik, Ibrahim El Hakami

As singer

 2017: Bashouf Feeki
 2016: Masdoum Atefiyan
 2010: Betnassiny Hayati
 2010: Ana Mestani Aleik
 2009: Lw 2olt Bahebak

References

External links 
 Official website

Living people
21st-century Egyptian male singers
Egyptian composers
Singers who perform in Egyptian Arabic
Lebanese composers
Lebanese singers
Lebanese record producers
Egyptian record producers
Year of birth missing (living people)